The following are the winners of the 19th annual (1992) Origins Award, presented at Origins 1993:

External links
  1992 Origins Awards Winners

1992 awards
1992 awards in the United States
Origins Award winners